Neighbourhood Watched is a British reality television programme focusing on the lives of Housing Officers and their tenants.

Episode list

Critical reception 
The programme is critically acclaimed. Neil Midgley of The Daily Telegraph, called the story-telling "a cut above". David Rigby of The Guardian, while noting the housing sector gave it "a mixed reaction", praised the transparency it provided. Rigby called the show "a great advert for the diverse qualities...of landlords".

References

External links 
 
 
 Neighbourhood Watched - Raw TV
 Neighbourhood Watched: Behind the scenes of a social housing documentary

British reality television series
BBC Television shows
2010s British television series
2009 British television series debuts